Just as I Am may refer to:

 Just as I Am (Bill Withers album), 1971
 Just as I Am (Yolanda Adams album), 1987
 Just as I Am (Dee Harvey album), 1991
 Just as I Am, a 1999 Grammy-nominated album by Andy Griffith - see Grammy Award for Best Southern, Country or Bluegrass Gospel Album
 Just as I Am (Guy Sebastian album), 2003
 Just as I Am (Paul Brandt album), 2012
 Just as I Am (Brantley Gilbert album), 2014
 Just as I Am (hymn), an 1835 hymn by Charlotte Elliott
 Just as I Am (Rob Hegel song), 1982
 "Just as I Am" (Air Supply song), 1985
 "Just as I Am", a song by Dee Harvey, 1992
 "Just as I Am" (Ricky Van Shelton song), 1993
 "Just as I Am", a song by Debelah Morgan from the 2005 album Light at the End of the Tunnel
 Just as I Am: The Autobiography of Billy Graham, a 1997 book by Billy Graham
 Just as I Am, a 2021 book by Cicely Tyson